Kashkevar (also known as Koshkbar and Kūshkehbar) is a village in Aq Kahriz Rural District, Nowbaran District, Saveh County, Markazi Province, Iran. At the 2006 census, its population was 17, in 4 families.

References 

Populated places in Saveh County